Edwin Ross Adair (December 14, 1907 – May 5, 1983) was an American lawyer and World War II veteran who served ten terms as a U.S. Representative from Indiana from 1951 to 1971.

Early life
Born in Albion, Indiana, Adair attended grade and high schools in that city. He graduated from Hillsdale College in Michigan, A.B., 1928, and from George Washington University Law School, Washington, D.C., LL.B., 1933.

He was admitted to the Indiana bar in 1933 and commenced the practice of law in Fort Wayne, Indiana. He served as probate commissioner of Allen County, Indiana from 1940 to 1950. During World War II, he was called to active duty as a second lieutenant in the Quartermaster Corps Reserve in September 1941 and served until October 1945. He received battle stars for the Normandy, Northern France, Ardennes, Rhine and Central European campaigns.

U.S. Representative
Adair was elected as a Republican from Indiana's 4th congressional district to the Eighty-second and to the nine succeeding Congresses (January 3, 1951 – January 3, 1971). Adair voted in favor of the Civil Rights Acts of 1957, 1960, 1964, and 1968, and the Voting Rights Act of 1965, but voted present on the 24th Amendment to the U.S. Constitution. He was an unsuccessful candidate for reelection in 1970 to the Ninety-second Congress. He served as the United States Ambassador to Ethiopia from 1971 to 1974.

He resumed the practice of law in Fort Wayne, Indiana, where he resided until his death there, May 5, 1983. He was interred at Greenlawn Memorial Park and Mausoleum in Fort Wayne.

See also
E. Ross Adair Federal Building and United States Courthouse

References

Citations

Sources
 
 
 

1907 births
1983 deaths
Ambassadors of the United States to Ethiopia
Hillsdale College alumni
Politicians from Fort Wayne, Indiana
George Washington University Law School alumni
Quartermasters
United States Army officers
Candidates in the 1970 United States elections
People from Albion, Indiana
United States Army personnel of World War II
20th-century American politicians
20th-century American diplomats
United States Army reservists
Republican Party members of the United States House of Representatives from Indiana